The Ministry of Information and Telecommunications is the ministry in the Government of Serbia which is in charge of information and telecommunications. The Ministry of Information merged into the Ministry of Culture on 25 January 2001 and was re-instated again under the third cabinet of Ana Brnabić in 2022.

List of ministers

Defunct government ministries of Serbia
1991 establishments in Serbia
Ministries established in 1991
2001 disestablishments in Serbia
Ministries disestablished in 2001
Serbia